Dean Byrne may refer to:

 Dean Byrne (boxer) (born 1984), American-based Irish boxer
 Dean Byrne (rugby league) (born 1981), former rugby league footballer